Alan Robert Kohler  (born 26 April 1952) is an Australian financial journalist and newspaper editor. He currently writes for his own online financial publication, The Constant Investor.

Career 
In 1969, Kohler began as a cadet on The Australian. He has been a columnist for Chanticleer in The Australian Financial Review and served as its editor between 1985 and 1988. He was editor of The Age from 1992 to 1995.

Kohler was chief executive and a major shareholder of Australian Independent Business Media Pty Ltd, which published the online investment newsletter Eureka Report and the free, 24-hour business news and commentary website Business Spectator since 2007.
AIBM was sold for $30m in 2012 to News Corp; Kohler remained as editor-in-chief. 

Alan Kohler appeared on the ABC's Inside Business from 2002 to 2013 and continues to appear on ABC News. He was chairman of Melbourne University Press between 2008 and 2012.

In July 2016, following the sale of Eureka Report, Kohler started The Constant Investor—a new subscription model for investors and finance-related clients. 

In November 2018, Kohler sold The Constant Investor to InvestSMART Group Limited with the agreement to merge the business with InvestSMART's Eureka Report. In December 2018, he joined InvestSMART Group Limited as the group’s Editor-in-chief. The Constant Investor website was closed down in August 2019, with all new and old content from The Constant Investor made available within the Eureka Report website.

Personal life 
Kohler is married to journalist and author Deborah Forster. They have three children. Kohler's son, Chris is a Business, Finance & Property reporter with Nine News.

Bibliography
Making Money: Alan Kohler's guide for the independent investor (2005)
The Constant Investor: A quarterly update of insights and reflections (2017)
It's Your Money: How banking went rogue, where it is now and how to protect and grow your money (2019)
 'InvestSMART Editor in Chief' (2018 - present)

References

External links
The Constant Investor
Eureka Report
Business Spectator

1952 births
Living people
ABC News (Australia) presenters
Australian columnists
Australian newspaper editors
Members of the Order of Australia